Kerchian (also Romanized as Kerchīān, Karchīān, and Kercheyān) is a village in Silakhor-e Sharqi Rural District, in the Central District of Azna County, Lorestan Province, Iran. At the 2006 census, its population was 257, in 51 families.

References 

Towns and villages in Azna County